This is a list of MPs elected to the House of Commons at the 9th 1830 United Kingdom general election, arranged by constituency. The Parliament was summoned 24 July 1830, assembled 14 September 1830 (but prorogued to 26 October) and dissolved 23 April 1831. The Prime Minister was the leader of the Whig Party, Charles Grey, 2nd Earl Grey.



Notes

See also 
1830 United Kingdom general election
List of United Kingdom by-elections (1818–1832)
List of parliaments of the United Kingdom

1830 United Kingdom general election
1830
 
UK MPs